Stephen B. Roman may refer to:
 Stephen Boleslav Roman (1921–1988), Canadian mining engineer
 Stephen B. Roman (ship), a 1965 Canadian lake freighter and bulk carrier